Wyoming Highway 313 (WYO 313) is a  Wyoming State Road located in southeastern Platte County and southwestern Goshen County that provides travel between Chugwater and Interstate 25 to US 85 south of Hawk Springs.

Route description 
Wyoming Highway 313 begins at its west end at Wyoming Highway 321 Interstate 25 Business). WYO 313 travels  to US 85 near Hawk Springs State Recreation Area, south of Hawk Springs.

Major intersections

References

External links 

Wyoming State Routes 300-399
WYO 313 - US 85 to WYO 321
WYO 313 - WYO 321 to I-25/US 87

Transportation in Platte County, Wyoming
Transportation in Goshen County, Wyoming
313